Dallas is a 1950 American Western Technicolor film directed by Stuart Heisler, and starring Gary Cooper, Ruth Roman, Barbara Payton, and Raymond Massey. The film is set in the title city during the Reconstruction Era of the United States.

Plot
Blayde Hollister is a former Confederate out to revenge himself on a group of carpetbaggers who murdered his family and destroyed their home in Georgia. With the help of his friend Wild Bill Hickok, Hollister's death is faked and he accompanies and swaps identities with Federal Marshal Martin Weatherby. Martin is an inexperienced dude from the East using the position of Marshal to impress his fiancée Tonia, whose Mexican family is being terrorized by the same gang that murdered Reb's family and terrorized Georgia. Hollister, posing as the dude Martin, protects both men and lets them get closer to the carpetbaggers.

Cast
 Gary Cooper as Blayde Hollister
 Ruth Roman as Tonia Robles
 Steve Cochran as Bryant Marlow
 Raymond Massey as Will Marlow
 Barbara Payton as Flo
 Leif Erickson as U.S. Marshal Martin Weatherby
 Antonio Moreno as Don Felipe Robles
 Jerome Cowan as Matt Coulter
 Reed Hadley as Wild Bill Hickok
 Al Ferguson as Citizen (uncredited)
 Philo McCullough as Townsman (uncredited)
 Jack Mower as Citizen (uncredited)

Reception
According to Warner Bros' accounts, the film earned $2,765,000 domestically and $1,725,000 foreign. The film received positive reviews from critics.

Novelization
Approximately concurrent with the release of the film and probably (in the tradition of the era) a month or two in advance, Gold Medal Books issued a novelization of the screenplay. Its prolific author, writing under his own name, Will F. Jenkins, would become and remain better known by his alternate by-line, Murray Leinster, under which he is considered one of the essential pioneers of the Golden Age of Science Fiction.

References

External links

 
 
 
 

1950 Western (genre) films
1950 films
American Western (genre) films
Films directed by Stuart Heisler
Films scored by Max Steiner
Films set in Dallas
Warner Bros. films
United States Marshals Service in fiction
Cultural depictions of Wild Bill Hickok
1950s English-language films
1950s American films